The dimorphic fantail (Rhipidura brachyrhyncha) is a species of bird in the family Rhipiduridae.
It is found in New Guinea. Its natural habitat is subtropical or tropical moist montane forests.

References

dimorphic fantail
Birds of New Guinea
Birds described in 1871
Taxonomy articles created by Polbot